Rattana Sangsoma (born 2 June 1989) is a Thai cricketer. She played for the Thailand women's national cricket team in the 2017 Women's Cricket World Cup Qualifier in February 2017.

References

External links
 

1989 births
Living people
Rattana Sangsoma
Place of birth missing (living people)
Cricketers at the 2010 Asian Games
Cricketers at the 2014 Asian Games
Rattana Sangsoma
Southeast Asian Games medalists in cricket
Competitors at the 2017 Southeast Asian Games
Rattana Sangsoma